Omorgus italicus is a species of hide beetle in the subfamily Omorginae and subgenus Afromorgus.

References

italicus
Beetles described in 1853